The 2009–10 Coupe de France is the 93rd season of the French most prestigious cup competition, organized by the French Football Federation, and is open to all clubs in French football, as well as clubs from the overseas departments and territories (Guadeloupe, French Guiana, Martinique, Mayotte, New Caledonia, French Polynesia, and Réunion). All of the teams that enter the competition, but were not members of Ligue 1 or Ligue 2, have to compete in the regional qualifying rounds. The regional qualifying rounds determine the number of regional clubs that will earn spots in the 7th round and normally lasts six rounds.

See 2009–10 Coupe de France for details of the rounds from the 7th Round onwards.

Calendar
On 23 June 2009, the French Football Federation announced the calendar for the Coupe de France.

All times in the following tables are CET unless otherwise noted.

Third round

Fourth round

See also
 2009–10 Coupe de France
 2009–10 Coupe de France preliminary round
 2009–10 Coupe de France 1st round
 2009–10 Coupe de France 5th through 6th rounds
 2009–10 Ligue 1
 2009–10 Ligue 2
 2009–10 Championnat National
 2009–10 Championnat de France Amateur
 2009–10 Championnat de France Amateur 2

References

External links
 Official site 

3

de:Coupe de France 2009/10
fr:Coupe de France de football 2009-2010